The 1939–40 William & Mary Indians men's basketball team represented the College of William & Mary in intercollegiate basketball during the 1939–40 season. Under the first year of head coach Dwight Steussey, the team finished the season 13–10 and 6–5 in the Southern Conference. This was the 35th season of the collegiate basketball program at William & Mary, whose nickname is now the Tribe.

The Indians finished in a tie for 8th in the conference and did not quality for the 1940 Southern Conference men's basketball tournament.

William & Mary played its first overtime game in program history in February 1940 against Washington and Lee in a 33–36 loss. Additionally, the Indians played several teams for the first time this season, including St. Francis (NY), Seton Hall, The Citadel, and Furman.

Schedule

|-
!colspan=9 style="background:#006400; color:#FFD700;"| Regular season

Source

References

William & Mary Tribe men's basketball seasons
William and Mary Indians
William and Mary Indians Men's Basketball Team
William and Mary Indians Men's Basketball Team